Three Hills-Airdrie was a provincial electoral district in Alberta, Canada, mandated to return a single member to the Legislative Assembly of Alberta using the first-past-the-post method of voting from 1993 to 1997.

History
The Three Hills-Airdrie electoral district was created in the 1993 electoral district re-distribution from the Three Hills and Drumheller electoral districts. It would only be contested once in the 1993 Alberta general election, and represented by Progressive Conservative MLA Carol Louise Haley. The district was dissolved in the 1997 electoral district re-distribution into the Airdrie-Rocky View and Olds-Didsbury-Three Hills electoral districts.

Members of the Legislative Assembly (MLAs)

Boundary history

Election results

1993 general election

See also
List of Alberta provincial electoral districts
Three Hills, Alberta, a town in Alberta
Airdrie, Alberta, a city in Alberta

References

Further reading

External links
Elections Alberta
The Legislative Assembly of Alberta

Former provincial electoral districts of Alberta
1993 establishments in Alberta
1997 disestablishments in Alberta
Constituencies established in 1993
Constituencies disestablished in 1997